Shishkov and Shishkova (feminine) is a common Russian surname.

People with this surname include:

 Alexander Shishkov, (1754–1841), a Russian statesman, writer, and admiral
 Vyacheslav Shishkov, a Russian and Soviet writer
 Evgenia Shishkova (b. 1972), a Russian professional pairs figure skater and coach
 Alena Shishkova, a Russian model

Russian-language surnames
Bulgarian-language surnames